Buynovo is a village in Northern Bulgaria. The village is located in Targovishte Municipality, Targovishte Province. Аccording to the numbers provided by the 2020 Bulgarian census, Buynovo currently has a population of 644 people with a permanent address registered in the settlement.

Geography 
Buynovo village is located in Municipality Targovishte. There is a water dam with the same name “Yazovir Buynovo” located in the same municipality. It stems from the river banks of Beli Lom river and Rusenski Lom rivers.

The elevation of the village ranges between 300 and 499 meters with an average elevation of 353 meters above sea level. The village's climate is continental.

Buildings and infrastructure 

 The local community hall and library “Razvitie” is still acting.
 There is a ritual hall in the village.

Ethnicity 
According to the Bulgarian population census in 2011.

References 

Villages in Targovishte Province